Suresh Menon (born 10 January 1967)  is an Indian actor, comedian and television personality.

Career
Menon has appeared in movies including Grand Masti, Phir Hera Pheri, Partner, Fool N Final, Krazzy 4, Deewane Huye Pagal, Chalte Chalte, God Only Knows, Dil To Pagal Hai and Hello. Additionally, he has made an appearance on the television show Comedy Circus. He has appeared as a judge on the game show Hello Kaun? Pehchaan Kaun on Indian television channel STAR One, along with Chunky Pandey. Menon also hosts a number of radio shows. He has participated in the reality show Jhalak Dikhhla Jaa. He is also the co founder of ONE (One Entertainment Networks) which is involved in production, curation and aggregation of content across digital platforms.

He also records a podcast called Kaanmasti along with VJ Jose and Cyril d'Abreo.

He was a part of the 2019 Amazon Prime Video show Jestination Unknown.
Currently he works as content head for MX Player

Filmography

Feature films

References

External links
 
 

1967 births
Living people
Indian male comedians
Male actors from Palakkad
20th-century Indian male actors
21st-century Indian male actors
Male actors in Hindi cinema
Male actors in Hindi television
Male actors in Malayalam cinema
Indian male film actors